Kuthoosi is a 2019 Indian Tamil-language action drama film written and directed by Siva Sakthi. The film stars Dileepan and Amala Rose Kurian in the lead roles while Yogi Babu and Siva play supportive roles in the film. The film was released on 25 January 2019 clashing with Charlie Chaplin 2 and Simba on the same date and opened to mostly average reviews from the critics.

Plot 
The film revolves around the hardships faced by farmers who struggle to make an impact in their lives and to make ends meet. Vel (Dileepan), who hails from Kallakurichi, is not interested in his father's occupation of farming and plans to settle in the US. He borrows money from his girlfriend (Amala Rose Kurian) and goes to Chennai in search for a job. After obtaining a job in a US-based company in Chennai, he comes back to the village and tell his parents about his plans of taking them along with him. However, his father's sudden demise spoils all of his plans, and later, he was compelled and pressured by his mother and girlfriend to take up farming and fulfill his father's dream of turning their land into a fertile one. In this pursuit, he is forced to lock horns with a landlord in his village who has been forcefully asking farmers to surrender their lands to him.

Cast 
 Dileepan as Velu
 Amala Rose Kurian as Velu's girlfriend
 V. I. S. Jayapalan
 Yogi Babu as Velu's friend
 Mippu
 Siva

Production
The film began its shoot in January 2014 and was predominantly completed in the following months. Financial problems meant that the film had a delayed release.

Soundtrack 

All songs are composed by N. Kannan.

References

External links 

 

2010s Tamil-language films
2019 action drama films
Indian action drama films
2019 films